Haynes King (born February 21, 2002) is an American football quarterback for the Georgia Tech Yellow Jackets. He previously played for the Texas A&M Aggies.

High school career
King attended Longview High School in Longview, Texas. As a senior, he was selected to the 2020 Under Armour All-American Game. He committed to Texas A&M University to play college football.

Statistics

Source:

College career

Texas A&M

2020
King played in two games as a backup quarterback to Kellen Mond his first year at Texas A&M in 2020. Prior to the 2021 season, he was named the team’s starting quarterback.

2021
On September 11, against Colorado, King suffered a lower right leg injury on a scramble in the first quarter and was out for the remainder of the game; he was replaced by sophomore Zach Calzada. On the Monday following the game, head coach Jimbo Fisher stated that King had a fractured leg and would be out indefinitely.

2022
On December 2, 2022, King entered the transfer portal.

Georgia Tech
On December 18, 2022, it was reported King had transferred to Georgia Tech.

Statistics

References

External links
Texas A&M Aggies bio

Living people
People from Longview, Texas
Players of American football from Texas
American football quarterbacks
Texas A&M Aggies football players
2002 births
Georgia Tech Yellow Jackets football players